Koitaki is a village along the Kokoda Track in Papua New Guinea to the east of Port Moresby.

Populated places in Papua New Guinea